Naughty Girl(s) may refer to:

 "Naughty Girl" (Beyoncé song), 2003
 "Naughty Girl" (Holly Valance song), 2002
 "Naughty Girl" (Mr G song), 2008
 Naughty Girl (film), a 1956 French musical film
 "Naughty Girls (Need Love Too)", a 1987 song by Samantha Fox

See also
 The Naughtiest Girl, a novel series by Enid Blyton
 Naughty Baby (album), a 1989 live album by Maureen McGovern
 Naughty Cinderella, a 1933 British comedy film
 Naughty Marietta (disambiguation)
 Nasty Girl (disambiguation)
 Naughty Boy (disambiguation)